Bishop of Santiago may refer to:

Anglican Bishop of Santiago, Chile.
Archbishop of Santiago (Chile), a Roman Catholic diocese in Chile.
Archbishop of Santiago de Compostela in Galicia (Spain).